Four Northern Banks referred to the four most capitalized commercial banks in the north of the Yangtze River in the Republic of China in the 1920s, in contrast to the Three Southern Banks (南三行) of Southern China.

The four banks were the Yien Yieh Commercial Bank (鹽業銀行), the Kincheng Banking Corporation (金城銀行), the Continental Bank (大陸銀行) and the China & South Sea Bank (中南銀行).

See also 

Yien Yieh Commercial Bank
Kincheng Banking Corporation
Continental Bank
China & South Sea Bank
Three Southern Banks

References

Defunct banks of China
Banking in China
1920s in China